Yuval Naimy (Born August 31, 1985) is a former Israeli professional basketball player. He played at the point guard position, standing at 1.88 (6 ft 2 in).

Early life
Naimy was born in Jerusalem. He played for Hapoel Jerusalem youth team.

Professional career
Naimy started his professional career with Hapoel Jeruslaem, with whom he won the ULEB Cup (now called EuroCup) championship in the 2003–04 season. In the 2005–06 season, he played with Maccabi Rosh HaAiyn of the Israeli 2nd Division Liga Leumit. Between 2005 and 2007, Naimy played with Maccabi Givat Shmuel. During the 2007–08 season, he played with Ironi Ashkelon, for which he averaged 14.4 points per game, in 27 games played.

In 2008, he returned to Hapoel Jerusalem The newspaper Haaretz described him as "one of the most talented players Jerusalem has seen in years". In the 2008–09 and 2009–10 seasons, he led Hapoel Jerusalem to win the Winner Cup, and to reach Israeli Super League Final Four.

On June 10, 2012, Naimy signed a one-year contract with the Russian team Triumph Lyubertsy. On October 14, 2012, Naimy recorded a season-high 27 points, shooting 7-of-12 from 3-point range, along with three rebounds and six assists in an 80–76 overtime win over Žalgiris.

On August 6, 2013, Naimy signed a three-year contract with the Israeli team Maccabi Tel Aviv. However, on December 10, 2013, Naimy parted ways with Maccabi and joined Hapoel Eilat for the rest of the season.

On July 22, 2014, Naimy signed with Bnei Herzliya for the 2014–15 season.

On July 15, 2015, Naimy signed a one-year deal with Ironi Nes Ziona. On February 1, 2016, Naimy recorded a career-high 35 points, shooting 12-of-23 from the field, along with four rebounds and five assists in an 86–91 loss to Maccabi Ashdod.

On September 22, 2016, Naimy signed a one-year deal with the Italian team Scafati Basket of the Serie A2 Basket. In 24 games played for Scafati, Naimy finished the season as the Serie A2 leading player in assists with 7.5 per game, he also averaged 15.6 points, 3 rebounds and 1.1 steals per game.

On July 20, 2017, Naimy signed with Unieuro Forlì for the 2017–18 season. On March 11, 2018, Naimy recorded a season-high 28 points, shooting 8-of-12 from 3-point range, along with four rebounds, six assists and two steals in a 96–82 win over Gagà Milano Orzibasket.

On August 9, 2018, Naimy signed a three-year deal with Maccabi Rehovot of the Israeli National League.

On February 5, 2020, Naimy signed with Elitzur Eito Ashkelon for the rest of the season.

Israeli national team
Naimy was a member of the senior Israeli national basketball team. He participated at the 2009 and the 2011 EuroBasket tournaments.

Personal life
Naimy is the brother-in-law of Danny Klein, Hapoel Jerusalem former chairman.

Career statistics

EuroCup

|-
| style="text-align:left;"| 2009–10
| style="text-align:left;" rowspan=3|  Hapoel Jerusalem
| 14 || 12 || 27.6 || .471 || .388 || .828 || 1.1 || 4.2 || 1.2 || .0 || 11.2 || 11.4
|-
| style="text-align:left;"| 2010–11
| 5 || 0 || 13.0 || .333 || .250 || .400 || 1.4 || 1.6 || .6 || .0 || 3.6 || 2.6
|-
| style="text-align:left;"| 2011–12
| 4 || 4 || 28.2 || .348 || .056 || 1.000 || 1.7 || 4.0 || 1.7 || .0 || 11.2 || 9.0
|-
| style="text-align:left;"| 2012–13
| style="text-align:left;" rowspan=1|  Triumph Lyubertsy
| 12 || 6 || 22.0 || .440 || .472 || .667 || 1.5 || 2.0 || .3 || .0 || 10.0 || 6.1
|-

References

External links
 RealGM Profile
 Eurobasket.com Profile
 Yuval Naimy Info page at FIBA.com

1985 births
Living people
BC Zenit Saint Petersburg players
Bnei Hertzeliya basketball players
Elitzur Eito Ashkelon players
Fulgor Libertas Forlì players
Hapoel Eilat basketball players
Hapoel Jerusalem B.C. players
Ironi Ashkelon players
Ironi Nes Ziona B.C. players
Israeli men's basketball players
Israeli Basketball Premier League players
Maccabi Givat Shmuel players
Maccabi Rehovot B.C. players
Maccabi Tel Aviv B.C. players
Point guards
Scafati Basket players
Sportspeople from Jerusalem